This list of Florida Gators starting quarterbacks includes members of the Florida Gators football team who have started at the quarterback position in one or more regular season or post-season games.  The Florida Gators represent the University of Florida in the sport of American football, and they compete in the Football Bowl Subdivision (FBS) of the National Collegiate Athletic Association (NCAA) and the Eastern Division of the Southeastern Conference (SEC).  Florida Gators quarterbacks have led their teams to 689 wins, forty post-season bowl games, eight SEC championships, and three consensus national championships.

Three Gators quarterbacks have won the Heisman Trophy: Steve Spurrier (1966), Danny Wuerffel (1996), and Tim Tebow (2007).  Five have been recognized as first-team All-Americans: Spurrier (1966), John Reaves (1971), Wuerffel (1996), Rex Grossman (2000), and Tebow (2007).  Eighteen have been inducted into the University of Florida Athletic Hall of Fame, including sixteen recognized as "Gator Greats" for their college sports careers, and two as "Distinguished Lettermen" for their post-college career achievements.  Two former Gators quarterbacks have returned to lead the Gators as their head coach: Doug Dickey (1970–78) and Steve Spurrier (1990–2001).

Main starting quarterbacks

1906 to 1911 
The following players were the predominant quarters for the Gators each season the team was a non-conference independent team, following the birth of Florida football.

1912 to 1921 (incomplete)

The following quarterbacks were the predominant quarters for the Gators each season after they joined the Southern Intercollegiate Athletic Association until the establishment of the Southern Conference.

1922 to 1932

The following quarterbacks were the predominant quarters for the Gators each season after the establishment of the Southern Conference until the establishment of the Southeastern Conference.

1933 to present

The following quarterbacks were the starters and/or leading passer for the Gators each season since joining the Southeastern Conference in 1933.

References

Bibliography
 

Florida Gators
 
Football QB